Vestfrost or Vestfrost Household is a manufacturer of major appliance. The Company is based in Esbjerg, Denmark. Since 1963 they have sold more than 12 million refrigerators and freezers. In 2008 Vestfrost was bought by the Turkish appliance manufacturer Vestel. In 2006 they had more than 300 employees in Esbjerg. In 2007 they had DKK 918,000,000 in revenue. Today most of the manufacturing is localised in Turkey and Slovakia. Their product range include refrigerators, freezers, washing machines, wine cellular, ovens and hobs.

References

External links
Vestfrost Website

Home appliance manufacturers of Denmark
Home appliance brands
Companies based in Esbjerg Municipality
Danish brands
Danish companies established in 1963